OÜ NG Investeeringud is an industry, retail trade and real estate investment group based on Estonian private capital, which employs more than 4300 people.

NG Investeeringud has a majority holding in the Tallinna Kaubamaja group and owns the ice cream producer Balbiino, alcoholic beverage producer Liviko, shop fittings and contract furniture manufacturer Kitman Thulema and real estate companies Roseni Kinnisvara and Roseni Majad.

Via the Tallinna Kaubamaja group's supermarket chain Selver, Tallinna Kaubamaja Kinnisvara, ABC King and SHU footwear shops, I.L.U. beauty products store chain, vehicle companies KIA Auto and Viking Motors in Estonia, SIA Forum Auto in Latvia and UAB KIA Auto in Lithuania also belong among NG Investeeringud's companies.

24 subsidiaries in Estonia, Latvia, Lithuania and Finland belong to the NG Investeeringud group.

The majority shareholder of NG Investeeringud is NG Kapital with 68.75%, equal shareholders of which are Jüri Käo, Enn Kunila and Andres Järving.

In 2019, the group's turnover was 873 million euros and net profit 34.1 million euros. 25.1 million euros were invested in fixed assets. A year earlier, turnover and profit were 822 million and 31.2 million euros, respectively.

NG Investeeringud board
 Jüri Käo, Chairman of the Board
 Enn Kunila, Vice Chairman of the Board
 Andres Järving, Vice Chairman of the Board

References

External links
 

Financial services companies of Estonia